HD 59686 is a binary star system in the northern constellation of Gemini. It is visible to the naked eye as a dim point of light with an apparent visual magnitude of +5.45. The distance to this system is approximately 292 light years based on parallax, but it is drifting closer with a radial velocity of −34 km/s.

The visible component is an aging giant star with a stellar classification of K2III, meaning it has ceased fusing hydrogen in its core and on its way to becoming a red giant. The stellar radius is very large: 11.2 times that of the Sun. The star is around 2.7 billion years old with 1.4 times the mass of the Sun. It is radiating 58 times the luminosity of the Sun from its enlarged photosphere at an effective temperature of 4,670 K.

The secondary component has a minimum mass 53% that of the Sun, which indicates it must be a star rather than a brown dwarf or a planet.

Planetary system
In November 2003, a planet was announced orbiting the giant star.  A doppler spectrometer was used to look for effects on the star caused by the gravitational tug of the orbiting planet. Using the amplitude from the radial velocity method, he calculated the planetary mass as 5.25 Jupiter masses and with period 303 days. However that mass is only a minimum because the inclination of the orbit is not known. Using the stellar mass and period, he calculated the semimajor axis as 0.911 astronomical units. He found that the shape of the stellar wobble is circular, implying that the planet has zero eccentricity.

References

External links 
 

K-type giants
Planetary systems with one confirmed planet
Spectroscopic binaries

Gemini (constellation)
Durchmusterung objects
059686
036616
2877